Günter Weigand (born 1924) is a self-proclaimed “social lawyer” (Sozialanwalt), economist and amateur prosecutor who became victim of a judicial and psychiatric scandal. He was born in Olsztyn.

Heinrich Böll and the German expert in criminal law Karl Peters (among others) made it possible, that the Weigand case is known as a miscarriage of justice.

Publications (selection) 

 Die Berechtigung sittlicher Werturteile in den Sozialwissenschaften. Berlin: Duncker & Humblot, 1960. 
 Der Rechtsstaat wird uns nicht geschenkt! Lehren aus der Münsterschen Mordaffäre um den Gewalttod des Rechtsanwalts Blomert vom 25.August 1961. Selbstverlag, 1979, 132 Seiten,

Secondary literature 

 Jürgen Kehrer: Schande von Münster: Die Affäre Weigand. Waxmann 1996. 
 Dietmar Klenke: „1.4. Der Blomert-Weigand-Prozess als Imagekatastrophe für Münster.“ In: Schwarz - Münster - Paderborn: Ein antikatholisches Klischeebild. Waxmann 2008. p. 64-67.

References 

1924 births
Possibly living people
20th-century German economists
Anti-psychiatry
Overturned convictions in Germany
Psychiatric false diagnosis